Songgwangmae Memorial Museum (aka Songgwang Maewon) is a museum located in Dong district, Daegu, South Korea.

The museum's collection is mainly artifacts connected with traditional arts and industry in Korea. The founders of museum were Kwon Byeongtak and Song Suhee. The establishment of the museum was approved in March 2002.

References

External links 
  

Museums established in 2002
Museums in Daegu
Industry museums
Dong District, Daegu
2002 establishments in South Korea